Rocchetta (meaning little fort in Italian) may refer to:

People 
 Franco Rocchetta, italian politician

Places
Rocchetta a Volturno, Comune in the Province of Isernia
Rocchetta Belbo, Comune in the Province of Cuneo
Rocchetta di Vara, Comune in the Province of La Spezia
Rocchetta e Croce, Comune in the Province of Caserta
Rocchetta Ligure, Comune in the Province of Alessandria
Rocchetta Nervina, Comune in the Province of Imperia
Rocchetta Palafea, Comune in the Province of Asti
Rocchetta Sant'Antonio, Comune in the Province of Foggia
Rocchetta Tanaro, Comune in the Province of Asti
Rocchetta, Cerreto di Spoleto, a frazione in the Province of Perugia